The following is a list of cast members of the British semi-reality television programme The Only Way Is Essex.

Current cast
This is a list of the current cast members appearing in the show in order of their first appearance.

Former cast
This is a list of the former cast members appearing in the show in order of their last appearance.

Duration of cast

References

External links
 The Only Way Is Essex at itv.com
 

Cast
Lists of actors by British television series